Nangal Rajawatan is a tehsil (administrative area) in Dausa district in the state of Rajasthan, India. The tehsil had a population of 22,839 in 2011, spread over 256 villages. Nagal Rajawatan's postal index number is 303505 and its postal head office is Nangal Rajawatan town. Nangal Rajawatan became a tehsil by notification of the Government of Rajasthan on 31 May 2012.<ref name="tehsilnotification.MEENA HIGHCOURT which is situated about 300m away from  Nangal rajawatan famous in all around Rajasthan.Recently  main gate to enter in it built by rajyasabha MP Dr. Kirodi Lal Meena.
A famous temple pale paplaj mata is also situated near Nangal rajawatan in malwas village..

Geography 
Nangal Rajawatan Tehsil is in Dausa district in the state of Rajasthan, India.

Demographics 
According to the 2011 census, Nangal Rajawatan Tehsil had a population of 22,839. Its literacy rate was higher than the state average, 69.72% compared to 66.11% for Rajasthan as a whole. Male literacy was 83.95% while the female literacy rate was 54.32%. The population of children aged 0–6 was 16.27% of the total population of the tehsil. The sex ratio was 911, which is lower than Rajasthan state average of 928. Child Sex Ratio for the Nangal Rajawatan as per census is 841, lower than Rajasthan average of 888.

Administration 

Nangal Rajawatan became a tehsil by notification of the Government of Rajasthan on 31 May 2012. As per the Constitution of India and the Panchyati Raaj Act, Nangal Rajawatan Tehsil is administrated by a sarpanch (village head) who is elected to represent the village. The tehsil includes 256 villages.

Villages 

Villages in Nangal Rajawatan Tehsil

References 

 http://www.bor.rajasthan.gov.in/circular/TehsilNotification.pdf
 http://www.censusindia.gov.in/2011census/dchb/0811_PART_B_DCHB_0811_DAUSA.pdf
 http://www.abutimes.com/list-of-districts-and-tehsils-in-rajasthan/
 http://badhatarajasthan.com/%E0%A4%A8%E0%A4%88-%E0%A4%A4%E0%A4%B9%E0%A4%B8%E0%A5%80%E0%A4%B2%E0%A5%8B%E0%A4%82-%E0%A4%8F%E0%A4%B5%E0%A4%82-%E0%A4%89%E0%A4%AA-%E0%A4%A4%E0%A4%B9%E0%A4%B8%E0%A5%80%E0%A4%B2%E0%A5%8B%E0%A4%82/
 http://rajasthanpatrika.patrika.com/story/dausa/designed-to-offer-the-newly-created-panchayat-smitioen-330864.html
 http://emitra.gov.in/distKsk.jsp?distCd=11&distNm=Dausa

Cities and towns in Dausa district